The 1975 ShellSPORT 5000 European Championship    was a motor racing series for Formula 5000 cars. The series was organized in the United Kingdom by the British Racing and Sports Car Club, but also incorporated European rounds. It was the seventh and last in a sequence of annual European Formula 5000 Championships, and the first to be contested as the ShellSPORT 5000 European Championship. The 1975 championship was won by Teddy Pilette, driving a Lola T400.

Calendar
 
The championship was contested over sixteen rounds.

Points system
Championship points were awarded on a 20–15–12–10–8–6–4–3–2–1 basis for the first ten places at each of the first fifteen rounds and on a 40–30–24–20–16–12–8–6–4–2 basis for the first ten places at the final round. Each driver could retain points from twelve rounds.

Championship standings

References

European Formula 5000 Championship seasons
ShellSPORT